Shibin El Qanater, previously known as Shaybin al-Qasr and Scenae Veteranorum is a region (markaz) in Egypt situated in the center of the Qalyubia Governorate. Its population was 423,783 at the 2006 Census and comprises 36 villages.

History 

The modern town used to be a Roman army encampment serving as a station of cavalry units "Equites Saraceni Thamudeni" and "Ala quinta Raetorum".

The town of Shibin El Qanater is one of the ancient villages, where it appeared in the name of “Shibin Al-Qasr” in the book “The Laws of Diwans of Al-Asaad Bin Mattati” from the works of Al-Sharqiya, which is the name given to it in the Salahi rock conducted by the Ayyubid Sultan Al-Nasir Salah Al-Din in the year 572 AH / 1176 AD, as it was mentioned in the name “Shibin Al-Qasr One of Qalubia’s works in the book “A Sunni Masterpiece in the Names of the Egyptian Countries” by Ibn Al-Jiaan who surrounded the Egyptian villages after the Nasserite rock that was conducted by the Mamluk Sultan Al-Nasir Muhammad bin Qalawun in 715 AH / 1315AD. In the Ottoman era, it was mentioned in the Ottoman sources, which was conducted by the Ottoman governor Suleiman Pasha Al-Khadim during the era of the Ottoman Sultan Suleiman the Magnificent within the villages of the province of Qaliubiya.

Ramzi connects the first part of the name to  ʾašyab "grey-coloured, old" akin to the  "old".

Among the most important monuments found in the region are huge ruins that were used in building a weird style on the Egyptian architecture. It indicates that the dead are not Egyptians, this region is known as the Jewish hill, and there are other remains that have not yet been discovered, and on their way to discovery.

List of villages
 El Ahraz
 El Hasafah
 El Kulzom
 El Shawbak
 El Zahweyeen
 Ezbet El Gewily
 Ezbet El Wakeel
 Kafr El Dair
 Kafr El Shaikha Salma
 Kafr El Shawbak
 Kafr El Sohby
 Kafr Shibin
 Kafr Taha
 Mansh'at El Keram
 Menyet Shibin
 Nawa (Shibin El Qanater)
 Shibin El-Qanater
 Taha Nub
 Tal Bani Tamim
 Elmoreeg

References

External links
 Rail accident

Populated places in Qalyubiyya Governorate
Cities in Egypt